Nuno Tristão Futebol Clube da Bula is a Guinea-Bissauan football club based in Bula. They play in the Campeonato Nacional da Guine-Bissau.

They were formerly called Bula FC.

Achievements
Campeonato Nacional da Guiné-Bissau: 1
 2014

Taça Nacional da Guiné Bissau: 1
 1978–79

Stadium
Currently the team plays at the Estádio José Ansumane Queta.

References

External links

:fr:Nuno Tristão Futebol Clube

Football clubs in Guinea-Bissau
Sport in Bissau